The 2020 Omloop Het Nieuwsblad was a road cycling one-day race that took place on 29 February 2020 in Belgium, starting in Gent and finishing in Ninove. It was the 75th edition of the Omloop Het Nieuwsblad and the fourth event of the 2020 UCI World Tour.

Teams
Twenty-five teams were invited to the race, which included all nineteen UCI WorldTour teams and six UCI Professional Continental teams. Each team started with seven riders for a total of 175 riders; of these, only 69 riders finished.

UCI WorldTeams

 
 
 
 
 
 
 
 
 
 
 
 
 
 
 
 
 
 
 

UCI Professional Continental Teams

Pre-race favourites

Mathieu van der Poel was the favourite to win, but was forced to withdraw through illness. The 2016 and 2017 winner, Greg Van Avermaet, was the subsequent favourite for victory. The 2019 winner, Zdeněk Štybar, also returned to defend his title.

Result

References

External links
 

2020 UCI World Tour
2020
Omloop Het Nieuwsblad
Omloop Het Nieuwsblad